Jeffrey Robert Barnes (born 9 January 1948) is an Australian cricketer. He played eleven first-class and three List A matches for South Australia between 1972 and 1975.

References

External links
 

1948 births
Living people
Australian cricketers
South Australia cricketers
Cricketers from Adelaide